Phaeocalicium is a genus of lichen-forming fungi in the family Mycocaliciaceae. The genus was circumscribed in 1970 by German lichenologist Alexander Schmidt, with Phaeocalicium praecedens assigned as the type species.

Species
Phaeocalicium ahtii 
Phaeocalicium asciiforme 
Phaeocalicium atenitikon 
Phaeocalicium betulinum 
Phaeocalicium boreale 
Phaeocalicium compressulum 
Phaeocalicium curtisii 
Phaeocalicium flabelliforme 
Phaeocalicium fuegensis 
Phaeocalicium gracile 
Phaeocalicium interruptum 
Phaeocalicium matthewsianum 
Phaeocalicium mildeanum 
Phaeocalicium minutissimum 
Phaeocalicium pinaceum 
Phaeocalicium polyporaeum 
Phaeocalicium populneum 
Phaeocalicium praecedens 
Phaeocalicium tibellii 
Phaeocalicium tibetanicum 
Phaeocalicium tremulicola 
Phaeocalicium triseptatum

References

Eurotiomycetes
Eurotiomycetes genera
Taxa described in 1970